Lake Fremont or Fremont Lake may refer to:

Fremont Lake (Murray County, Minnesota)
Lake Fremont Township, Martin County, Minnesota